Mine Onsen, also known by the name of the public bathhouse facility, Odoriko Onsen, is a geothermal hot spring located in Daifunto park, Kawazu, Shizuoka Prefecture, Japan. The hot springs are accessible from Tokyo on the Odoriko or the Super View Odoriko  train lines.

Water profile
Mine Onsen is part of the Kawazu hot spring system. The mineral water is high in sodium chloride and sulphur; it emerges from the source at 143°F (61.6°C). There is a geyser onsite, which erupts regularly, shooting water into the air at 200°F.

Thermus thermophilus bacteria has been isolated in the hot spring water.

See also
 List of hot springs in Japan
 List of hot springs in the world

References

Hot springs of Shizuoka Prefecture
Kawazu, Shizuoka